La Ferme Célébrités is the French version of the international TV show The Farm, produced in France by Endemol and broadcast on TF1. A certain number of B-List celebrities (about 14) appear on it. The show was running in 2004 and 2005, then in 2010. It was hosted by Christophe Dechavanne and Patrice Carmouze in 2004 and 2005 . The farm was located in Visan, Vaucluse in the first seasons. For the season 3, the farm is located in South Africa,  Benjamin Castaldi (who hosted the French Pop Idol and the French Big Brother, Secret Story) and Jean-Pierre Foucault (Miss France and Who wants to be a millionaire?) are the new hosts.

Season 1 (2004)

Season 2 (2005)

Season 3 (2010)

See also
The Farm

References

 
2004 French television series debuts
2010 French television series endings